Arnold Schottländer (2 April 1854 – 9 September 1909) was a German chess master.

Born in Münsterberg (now Ziębice), Silesia, he was one of the chess pupils of Adolf Anderssen.

He tied for 8-9th at Leipzig 1879 (the 1st DSB Congress, Berthold Englisch won), tied for 9-10th at Wiesbaden 1880 (Joseph Henry Blackburne, Englisch and Adolf Schwarz won), took 12th at Nuremberg 1883 (the 3rd DSB-Congress, Szymon Winawer won), took 16th at Hamburg 1885 (the 4th DSB-Congress, Isidor Gunsberg won), tied for 5-6th at Leipzig 1888 (Curt von Bardeleben and Fritz Riemann won), tied for 11-13th at Dresden 1892 (the 7th DSB-Congress, Siegbert Tarrasch won).

He is buried in the Jewish cemetery of Breslau.

References

External links
The chess games of Arnold Schottländer

1854 births
1909 deaths
Silesian Jews
German chess players
Jewish chess players
People from the Province of Silesia
19th-century chess players